Sé is a former civil parish in the municipality of Bragança, Portugal. In 2013, the parish merged into the new parish Sé, Santa Maria e Meixedo. The population in 2011 was 17,913, in an area of 10.72 km2.

Heritage

Bragança Castle
Pelourinho de Bragança
Domus Municipalis
Bragança Regional Hospital and Mental Health Center
Igreja Paroquial de São João Baptista or Igreja da Sé or Igreja dos Jesuítas

References

Former parishes of Bragança, Portugal